Humanoid Animation (HAnim) is an approved ISO and IEC standard for humanoid modeling and animation.  HAnim defines a specification for defining interchangeable human figures so that those characters can be used across a variety of 3D games and simulation environments.

The HAnim Standard was developed in the late 1990s and was significantly influenced by the Jack human modeling system and the research of experts in the graphics, ergonomics, simulation & gaming industry.

See also
 Rich Representation Language
 X3D
 VRML

Software 
 Bitmanagement Software Contact VRML/X3D Browser
 ExitReality VRML/X3D Freeware Browser
 Flux Player, VRML/X3D Freeware Browser
 Flux Studio, VRML/X3D Freeware Modeler. Exports H-Anim
 Seamless3d, Open Source Modeler. Exports and Imports H-Anim

External links 
Humanoid Animation Working Group 
Web3D Consortium
X3D Specification
ISO/IEC 19774:2006 Humanoid Animation (H-Anim) version 1 International Standard (IS)
 Humanoid Animation (HAnim) version 2 International Standard (IS)
Humanoid Hiro
Humanoid Y.T.

Animation techniques
Humanoids